Jing Fang (78–37 BC), born Li Fang, courtesy name Junming, was born in present-day 東郡頓丘 (Puyang, Henan) during the Han Dynasty (202 BC – 220 AD).  He was a Chinese music theorist, mathematician and astrologer. Although better known for his work in musical measurements, he also accurately described the basic mechanics of lunar and solar eclipses.

Yijing
The historian Ban Gu (32–92 AD) wrote that Jing Fang was an expert at making predictions from the hexagrams of the ancient Yijing. A book on Yijing divination attributed to him describes the najia method of hexagram interpretation, which correlates their separate lines with elements of the Chinese calendar.

Music theory
According to the 3rd-century historian Sima Biao, Jing Fang received an appointment as an official in the Music Bureau under Emperor Yuan of Han (r. 48–33 BC).

Jing Fang was the first to notice how closely a succession of 53 just fifths approximates 31 octaves.  He came upon this observation after learning to calculate the pythagorean comma between 12 fifths and 7 octaves (this had been published ca. 122 BC in the Huainanzi, a book is written for the prince of Huainan), and extended this method fivefold to a scale composed of 60 fifths, finding that after 53 new values became incredibly close to tones already calculated.

He accomplished this calculation by beginning with a suitable large starting value that could be divided by three easily, and proceeded to calculate the relative values of successive tones by the following method:

 Divide the value by three.  
 Add this value to the original. 
(Alternatively, he would subtract  from the interval, equivalent to a perfect fifth down, to keep all of the values greater than 177147, or less than 354294, it's double, effectively transposing them all into the range of a single octave.)
 Proceed now from this new value to generate the next tone; repeat until all tones have been generated.

To produce an exact calculation, some 26 digits of accuracy would have been required. Instead, by rounding to about 6 digits, his calculations are within 0.0145 cents of exactness, which is a difference much finer than is usually perceptible. The final value he gave for the ratio between this 53rd fifth and the original was 
—.

This value would later be calculated precisely by Nicholas Mercator in the 17th century (see: history of 53 equal temperaments).

Astronomy
He was also an advocate of the theory that the light emanating from the spherical Moon (as seen from Earth) was merely a reflection of sunlight.  This was known as the 'radiating influence' theory in ancient China, which stated that the light of the Moon was merely the light reflected from the Sun and that the celestial bodies were spherical. This accurate theory was dismissed by the philosopher Wang Chong (27–97 AD), yet embraced by the mathematician, inventor, and scientist Zhang Heng (78–139 AD).
 
Jing Fang stated:

Death
It is recorded that he was executed by beheading in the marketplace in 37 BC under the Emperor's orders after he allegedly slung false accusations at a high official for infringing upon the law.

See also
 Wen Wang Gua
 53 equal temperament
 Science and technology of the Han dynasty

Notes

References 
 Huang, Xiangpeng, "Jing Fang". Encyclopedia of China (Music and Dance Edition), 1st ed.
 McClain, Ernest and Ming Shui Hung. "Chinese Cyclic Tunings in Late Antiquity," Ethnomusicology, Vol. 23, No. 2 (1979): 205-224.
Needham, Joseph (1986). Science and Civilization in China: Volume 3, Mathematics and the Sciences of the Heavens and the Earth. Taipei: Caves Books, Ltd.
 Complete table of Jing Fang's hexagram values: Jing Fang Hexagram Table (obsolete)
 Comparing Jing Fang's and other hexagram sequences: Yijing Dao - Shao Yong square, Xiantian diagram, Jing Fang's 8 Palaces, biga, Mawangdui, and King Wen sequences

Chinese music theorists
1st-century BC Chinese astronomers
Chinese astrologers
Ancient Chinese mathematicians
Han dynasty philosophers
1st-century BC Chinese philosophers
78 BC births
37 BC deaths
Executed Han dynasty people
Han dynasty musicians
Han dynasty politicians from Henan
People executed by the Han dynasty by decapitation
Politicians from Puyang
Executed people from Henan
Political office-holders in Hebei
Musicians from Henan
Mathematicians from Henan
1st-century BC executions
Ancient astrologers
I Ching
1st-century BC mathematicians
1st-century BC Chinese musicians